No. 46 Squadron ( or LLv.46, from 3 May 1942 Le.Lv.46), renamed No. 46 Bomber Squadron (Finnish: Pommituslentolaivue 46 or PLe.Lv.46 on 14 February 1944) was a bomber squadron of the Finnish Air Force during World War II. The squadron was part of Flying Regiment 4.

Organization

Winter War
1st Flight (1. Lentue)
2nd Flight (2. Lentue)
3rd Flight (3. Lentue)

The Squadron was equipped with 9 Bristol Blenheim Mk.Is and 11 Bristol Blenheim Mk.IVs.

Continuation War
1st Flight (1. Lentue)
2nd Flight (2. Lentue)
3rd Flight (3. Lentue)
1st Flight of No. 48 Bomber Squadron (1./PLe.Lv.48)
Separate Photography Flight (Erillinen valokuvauslentue)

The equipment consisted of 15 Dornier Do 17Zs, 3 Bristol Blenheim Mk.IVs, 4 Ilyushin DB-3Ms, 3 Ilyushin Il-4s, 1 Douglas DC-2, and 1 Junkers aircraft.

The following 15 Do 17s were received:
 Dornier Do 17 Z-2, WkNr 3323, BC+NE. Redesignated DN-51. Flew 454 hours 25 minutes mission time. Destroyed/written off on 9 October 1944.  + Ten were lost between January 1943 and January 1945, the remaining five were not scrapped until in 1952.  
 Dornier Do 17 Z-3, WkNr 2608, DM+DV. Redesignated DN-52. Scrapped 19 September 1952.   
 Dornier Do 17 Z-3, WkNr 4242, DC+PZ. Redesignated DN-53. Flew 220 hours 5 minutes mission time. Destroyed 8 August 1943.   
 Dornier Do 17 Z-3, WkNr 2856, PF+CW. Redesignated DN-54. Flew 358 hours 35 minutes mission time. Destroyed 9 October 1944.   
 Dornier Do 17 Z-3, WkNr 3498, V5+MH. Redesignated DN-55. Logged 812 hours 5 minutes flying time. Scrapped 19 September 1952.   
 Dornier Do 17 Z-2, WkNr 3425, V5+BK. Redesignated DN-56. 639 hours 40 minutes mission time. Destroyed 9 October 1944.   
 Dornier Do 17 Z-1, WkNr 1155, C4+BZ. Redesignated DN-57. Logged 812 hours 5 minutes flying time. Scrapped 11 December 1952.   
 Dornier Do 17 Z-3, WkNr 2905, 5K+DV. Redesignated DN-58. Scrapped 19 September 1952.   
 Dornier Do 17 Z-1, WkNr 3228, V5+GL. Redesignated DN-59. Flew 884 hours 50 minutes mission time. Destroyed 9 September 1944.   
 Dornier Do 17 Z-3, WkNr 2818, 5K+CR. Redesignated DN-60. Flew 479 hours 5 minutes mission time. Destroyed 11 January 1945.   
 Dornier Do 17 Z-2, WkNr 4187, CQ+HG. Redesignated DN-61. Flew 348 hours 15 minutes mission time. Destroyed 9 October 1944.   
 Dornier Do 17 Z-3, WkNr 1218, V5+3L. Redesignated DN-62. Flew 704 hours 30 minutes mission time. Destroyed 9 January 1943.   
 Dornier Do 17 Z-3, WkNr 2873, PF+DN. Redesignated DN-63. Flew 505 hours 5 minutes mission time. Destroyed 9 September 1944.   
 Dornier Do 17 Z-3, WkNr 2622, 5M+L. Redesignated DN-64. Scrapped 19 September 1952.   
 Dornier Do 17 Z-1, WkNr 1175, PG+GA. Redesignated DN-65. Flew 95 hours 30 minutes mission time. Destroyed 16 July 1943.

References

Bibliography
 Goss, Chris. Dornier 17: In Focus. Surrey, UK: Red Kite Books, 2005. .
 Keskinen, Kalevi and Kari Stenman. Suomen Ilmavoimien historia 2: Dornier Do 17Z, Junkers Ju 88A-4. Hobby-Kustannus Oy, 1999. .
 Smith, J.R. The Do 17 and Do 215 (No. 164). London: Profile Publications, 1967.

Citations

External links
Lentolaivue 46

46